Hits Right Up Your Street is the fourteenth rock album by British instrumental (and sometimes vocal) group The Shadows, released in September 1981 through Polydor Records and Pickwick Records. The majority of the album is in the form of covers by popular artists at the time. Cover versions of songs by The Tornados, Ennio Morricone, Cliff Richard, John Lennon, Randy Crawford, Ray Stevens, Shakin' Stevens, ABBA, Rod Stewart, Leo Sayer, Anton Karas & B. Bumble and the Stingers

Track listing



Personnel 
Hank Marvin - lead guitar
Bruce Welch - rhythm guitar 
Brian Bennett - drums, percussion
With
Alan Jones - bass
Cliff Hall - keyboards

Arranged and produced by the Shadows

Charts

References 

1981 albums
The Shadows albums
Polydor Records albums
Pickwick Records albums